D. J. Woods (born November 29, 1989) is a gridiron football wide receiver who is currently a free agent. He was most recently a member of the Ottawa Redblacks of the Canadian Football League. He played college football at the University of Cincinnati and attended Strongsville High School in Strongsville, Ohio. He has also been a member of the Tennessee Titans and the Chicago Rush.

References

External links
Just Sports Stats
Cincinncati Bearcats bio
College stats
NFL Draft Scout
AFL profile
Tennessee Titans bio

Living people
1989 births
Players of American football from Ohio
American football wide receivers
Canadian football wide receivers
African-American players of American football
African-American players of Canadian football
Cincinnati Bearcats football players
Tennessee Titans players
Chicago Rush players
Ottawa Redblacks players
San Jose SaberCats players
People from Strongsville, Ohio
21st-century African-American sportspeople
20th-century African-American people